Käpa is a village in Estonia, in Võru Parish, which belongs to Võru County.

References

External links 
 Classification of Estonian administrative units and settlements 2012v1

Villages in Võru County
Võru Parish